The emerald cichlid (Hypselecara temporalis) is a small species of fish in the family Cichlidae. It is native to South America. It can reach lengths of up to 12”.

Climate
The fish lives in tropical climates, in temperatures between 25 and 30 degrees Celsius.

References

Heroini
Fish of South America
Taxa named by Albert Günther
Fish described in 1862